Euseius brazilli is a species of mite in the family Phytoseiidae.

References

brazilli
Articles created by Qbugbot
Animals described in 1975